"Christmas Crackers" is the first Christmas special episode of the BBC sitcom Only Fools and Horses. It was originally screened on 28 December 1981 and is the first episode of the series to run at over 30 minutes.

Synopsis
It is Christmas Day and Grandad is cooking the dinner while Rodney is reading a book on body language which Mickey Pearce has lent him. Del Boy arrives and gives Grandad £20 for Christmas, however Grandad tells Del that he has not got him a present this year as "I don't agree with the commercialisation of a Christian festival." Rodney is worried about Grandad's cooking, and suggests to Del that they go on a hunger strike to get out of eating it, but Del refuses, saying that it is Grandad's role to cook the dinner as it makes him feel as though he is still needed in the family.

Later, as the trio sit down to Christmas dinner, Del is horrified to discover that the turkey is under-cooked and still contains the melted bag of giblets stuffed inside along with the sage and onion stuffing. Christmas Pudding is no better, which Grandad has literally burnt to a cinder.

Later that evening Del is snoozing on the sofa while Rodney begrudgingly watches a circus on the television. Waking Del with his protestations of boredom, Rodney suggests that he and Del visit the Monte Carlo Club in New Cross for a drink. They begin to argue, with Del explaining that Grandad would be hurt if they left him alone on Christmas night. However, Grandad appears and announces he is off out to a Christmas party as he annoyed by the brothers arguing. Consequently, Del and Rodney decide to go out after all.

At the nightclub, Rodney spots two attractive woman sitting at a table on the other side of the bar. Intending to go over and flirt to them, he prepares himself by reading from Mickey Pearce's body language book. He attempts a "masculine walk" to impress the girls which Del teases him about, and Rodney becomes embarrassed. The two spend most of the evening arguing about the best way to approach the girls, taking so long over it that, by the time they get around to approaching the women, they find that two other men have beaten them to it.

Episode cast

Production
This was the only episode of Only Fools and Horses between 1981 and 1987 not to be produced by Ray Butt, who after the first series of the show was reassigned to Seconds Out by the BBC. The initial plan was for Martin Shardlow, who had directed the first series, to also take on the producer's role for this episode and the second full series. However, Shardlow and John Sullivan could not agree on a future direction for the show, which eventually resulted in Shardlow deciding not to take the producer's role and leaving the show altogether. With this episode in danger of not being filmed in time for Christmas 1981, Ray Butt arranged for his close friend and fellow BBC producer Bernard Thompson to produce and direct the episode, and Butt would subsequently return as producer (and this time director) for the second series.

Music
 Brotherhood of Man: "Three Times A Lady"
 Cliff Richard: "Daddy's Home"
 Cliff Richard: "Shakin' All Over"
 Jane Fonda Walkout I: "Xenon Lights"
 Tom Tom Club: "Wordy Rappinghood"
 The Waitresses: "Christmas Wrapping"
 Brotherhood of Man: "Bright Eyes"

Jane Fonda Walkout I: "Xenon Lights"

Note: In the Original Broadcast version the tune Xenon Lights from Jane Fonda's Walkout I was playing in the nightclub whilst Del and Rodney were waiting to sit down. In all future releases including the VHS/DVD versions, this tune has been replaced by "Wordy Rappinghood" by Tom Tom Club.

Ronnie Hazlehurst: Original Theme Tune

Note: In the original series 1 broadcasts of Only Fools and Horses, the theme tune was very different to the version adopted from series 2, which became the standard version known today. Composed by Ronnie Hazlehurst, the original theme tune was a jazzy instrumental tune that played over the start and end credits. This tune was replaced in series 2 with a version written and sung by John Sullivan. After the initial run of series 1, all future re-runs replaced the Hazlehurst version with John Sullivan's to match the other series. The VHS/DVD versions all contain John Sullivan's version, and recordings with Hazlehurst's original tune are extremely rare, though it can be heard in a scene during episode 1 of the first series.

References

External links

Episode Script

Only Fools and Horses special episodes
British Christmas television episodes
1981 British television episodes